Nancy O'Neil (born Nancy Muriel Smith; 25 August 1907 - 5 March 1995) was an Australian-born British actress.

Partial filmography

Bibliography
 Chibnall, Steve. Quota Quickies: The Birth of the British 'B' film. British Film Institute, 2007.

External links

 Nancy O'Neil Obituary in The Independent

1907 births
1995 deaths
British film actresses
British stage actresses
Australian film actresses
Australian stage actresses
Actresses from Sydney
20th-century British actresses
Alumni of RADA
Australian emigrants to the United Kingdom